Siberian lily is a common name for several plants and may refer to:

Ixiolirion tataricum, with blue to purple flowers
Lilium pensylvanicum, with orange flowers